Stuart Horsepool (born 18 August 1961) is a British short track speed skater. He competed in the men's 5000 metre relay event at the 1992 Winter Olympics.

References

External links
 

1961 births
Living people
British male short track speed skaters
Olympic short track speed skaters of Great Britain
Short track speed skaters at the 1992 Winter Olympics
Sportspeople from Nottingham